Serine/threonine-protein kinase PCTAIRE-3 is an enzyme that in humans is encoded by the PCTK3 gene.

References

Further reading

EC 2.7.11